The 2014–15 Washington Huskies men's basketball team represented the University of Washington in the 2014–15 NCAA Division I men's basketball season. The huskies were led by thirteenth year head coach Lorenzo Romar. The Huskies played their home games at Alaska Airlines Arena at Hec Edmundson Pavilion as members of the Pac-12 Conference. They finished the season 16–15, 5–13 in Pac-12 play to finish in eleventh place. They lost in the first round of the Pac-12 tournament to Stanford.

Previous season 
The 2013–14 Washington Huskies finished the season with an overall record of 17–15, and 9–9 in the Pac-12 regular season. In the 2014 Pac-12 tournament, the Huskies were defeated by Utah, 61–67 in the First round.

Off Season

Departures

Incoming Transfers

2014 Recruiting Class

2015 Recruiting Class

Personnel

Roster

Notes
- On January 26, Head Coach Lorenzo Romar announced that Sophomore center, Robert Upshaw would be dismissed from the team due to violation of team rules.

Coaching staff

Schedule

|-
!colspan=12 style="background:#363c74; color:#e8d3a2;"| Exhibition

|-
!colspan=12 style="background:#363c74; color:#e8d3a2;"| Non-conference regular season

|-
!colspan=12 style="background:#363c74;"| Pac-12 regular season

|-
!colspan=12 style="background:#363c74;"| Pac-12 Tournament

Ranking movement

See also
2014–15 Washington Huskies women's basketball team

References

Washington Huskies
Washington Huskies men's basketball seasons
Washington
Washington